Amaravila Rameswaram Sri Mahadeva Temple  is an ancient Hindu temple dedicated to Shiva is situated on the banks of the Neyyar (river) at Amaravila of  Neyyattinkara (tehsil) in Thiruvananthapuram District in Kerala state in India. The presiding deity of the temple is Lord Rameswara facing west. It is believed that Amaravila Rameswaram Sri Mahadeva temple is one of the 108 Shiva temples of Kerala and is installed by sage Parasurama dedicated to Shiva. The temple is located 6 km away from Neyyattinkara town in Amaravila village.

It is one of the two Rameswaram temples in 108 Shivalaya Sothram. The Kollam Rameshwaram Mahadeva Temple is the second Rameshwaram Temple. The temple is located in the town of Kollam.

See also
 108 Shiva Temples
 Temples of Kerala
 Kollam Rameswaram Mahadeva Temple

References

108 Shiva Temples
Shiva temples in Kerala
Hindu temples in Thiruvananthapuram district